Ernest Mottard (22 March 1902 – 30 December 1949) was a Belgian racing cyclist. He won the 1928 edition of the Liège–Bastogne–Liège.

References

External links
 

1902 births
1949 deaths
Belgian male cyclists
Cyclists from Liège Province
People from Grâce-Hollogne